Thompson's Bromine and Arsenic Springs, also known as Healing Springs, is a historic mineral spring resort and  national historic district located near Crumpler, Ashe County, North Carolina.  The district encompasses 10 contributing buildings and 1 contributing site.  They include the octagonal plan spring house and frame double cabin (c. 1900), frame bath house, a long frame cabin structure, 5 cabins (c. 1920), and a double cabin (c. 1930).  The Bromine-Arsenic Springs Hotel was constructed in 1887 and burned to the ground in 1962; its former location is considered an archaeological site.

It was listed on the National Register of Historic Places in 1976.

References

Historic districts on the National Register of Historic Places in North Carolina
Archaeological sites on the National Register of Historic Places in North Carolina
Hotel buildings on the National Register of Historic Places in North Carolina
Buildings and structures in Ashe County, North Carolina
National Register of Historic Places in Ashe County, North Carolina